The Rebel Billionaire: Branson's Quest for the Best is a reality show for Fox Broadcasting Company's fall 2004 season.

Premise
The premise for the series was that billionaire Richard Branson, founder of the Virgin Group, challenges 16 contestants to tasks that will prove to him which is most qualified to take over as president of Virgin. This format is strongly derivative of popular NBC reality show The Apprentice, though as well as business-related tasks it also incorporated many tough physical challenges, reflecting Branson's love of daredevil stunts.  Each week also saw the contestants travel to a different country, whereas The Apprentice is just situated in one area. Shawn Nelson was the winner.

Presentation
The one-hour show premiered on November 9, 2004 on the Fox network, and aired 12 episodes through January 2005. Although the show had over 5.5 million viewers, it was considered a ratings disappointment for American television prime-time programming. The show found ratings success internationally though, airing in 19 countries around the world, ranking as the #1 show in many countries where Richard Branson does business. The Rebel Billionaire also reran on the Fox Reality Channel.

Contestants
(as they appeared on the show & in order of elimination)

Broadcasting

References

External links
 
 The Rebel Billionaire at Reality TV World
 Salon.com article about the show

Fox Broadcasting Company original programming
2004 American television series debuts
2005 American television series endings
2000s American reality television series
Television series by Bunim/Murray Productions